William Riley Abbott House is a historic plantation house located near South Mills, Camden County, North Carolina. It was built about 1850 with the profits of the forced labor of about 40 enslaved people, and is a two-story, five-bay, Greek Revival-style frame dwelling. It has a vernacular Colonial Revival style portico that dates from the 1920s.

It was listed on the National Register of Historic Places in 1978.

References

Plantation houses in North Carolina
Houses on the National Register of Historic Places in North Carolina
Greek Revival houses in North Carolina
Colonial Revival architecture in North Carolina
Houses completed in 1850
Houses in Camden County, North Carolina
National Register of Historic Places in Camden County, North Carolina